A Cross the Universe may refer to:
A Cross the Universe (album), a 2008 live album by Justice
A Cross the Universe (film), a 2008 documentary about Justice

See also
 Across the Universe (disambiguation)